Gertak Sanggul is a village within the city of George Town in the Malaysian state of Penang. It is located within the Southwest Penang Island District, at the southwestern coast of Penang Island. Gertak Sanggul is an agricultural village, with fisheries and pig farming as its economic mainstays.

Etymology 
According to urban legend, Gertak Sanggul was named during World War II, when Penang was under Japanese occupation. The Malay ladies in the area, who typically tied their hair into buns (Malay: sanggul), would ride their bicycles along the area's uneven roads, causing their buns to come undone. The Japanese administrators on Penang Island henceforth referred to the area as Gertak Sanggul.

Demographics 
According to the 2010 National Census conducted by Malaysia's Department of Statistics, Gertak Sanggul contained a population of 925. Ethnic Chinese formed  of Gertak Sanggul's population, whilst the Malays made up close to 36% of the population.

Transportation 
The main thoroughfare within Gertak Sanggul is Jalan Gertak Sanggul, which forms part of the pan-island Federal Route 6. The road links the town with Balik Pulau to the north and Teluk Kumbar to the east.

Rapid Penang bus route 308 is the sole public bus service that runs into Gertak Sanggul, connecting the town with a handful of destinations along the eastern seaboard of Penang Island, including Bayan Lepas, Bayan Baru, Queensbay Mall, Universiti Sains Malaysia and Sungai Nibong.

Education 
Gertak Sanggul is served by a single primary school, SRJK (C) Poi Eng.

References

Southwest Penang Island District
Towns in Penang